"+INTERSECT+" is Japanese voice actress and singer Maaya Uchida's 5th single, released on June 21, 2017. The coupling song "Majo ni Naritai Hime to Hime ni Naritai Majo no Rhapsody" is a duet song with fellow voice actress, Sumire Uesaka.

Track listings

Charts

Album

References

2017 singles
2017 songs
J-pop songs
Japanese-language songs
Pony Canyon singles